The Força Sindical (FS) is a trade union centre in Brazil. It was formed in 1991 by Luis Antônio Medeiros, a leader from the Confederação Geral dos Trabalhadores.

The FS is affiliated with the International Trade Union Confederation.

References

External links
 www.fsindical.org.br Website.

Trade unions in Brazil
International Trade Union Confederation
National federations of trade unions
Trade unions established in 1991
1991 establishments in Brazil